The Musée Charles et Marguerithe Bieth is a museum located in Ivory Coast. It is located in Abengourou, Comoé District.

References

See also 
 List of museums in Ivory Coast

Museums in Ivory Coast
Abengourou
Buildings and structures in Comoé District